Tony Benson (born 22 December 1965) is a rugby league coach from New Zealand.

Coaching career

New Zealand
Benson coached Bartercard Cup team Hibiscus Coast Raiders from 2001 to 2005, as well as the Junior Kiwis team from 2003 to 2005.

Great Britain
Moving to Britain in September 2005, Benson took charge of Leigh Centurions. Leigh's relegation from Super League had been all but confirmed at the time of his appointment and he knew his task would be to lead the club back to the top. He replaced Darren Abram, who left the club in September 2005. In his only season in charge, Benson led the Centurions to cup glory, in the victory over Hull Kingston Rovers in the Northern Rail Cup final.

Benson parted company with Leigh after the club's defeat by Batley Bulldogs in the 2006 National League One playoffs. Following the announcement, a number of Leigh's coaching staff and management left the club, resigning to show solidarity with Benson.

In 2007, Benson coached the Ireland A squad in the four nations championship. He also led the Irish Wolfhounds on a tour of New Zealand.

He was appointed head coach of the London Skolars in December 2007 to replace Latham Tawhai, who left to become the understudy coach at neighbours Harlequins RL. Benson left his job at London Skolars at the end of the season due to the inconvenience of travelling from his home in Leigh, Greater Manchester.

In 2009 he was appointed head coach of Oldham R.L.F.C. in the British Rugby League National Championship 1.

When he left Oldham, Benson became the first coach of new side Oxford Rugby League. He left the club after two seasons. Benson subsequently took up a post with Belgium Rugby League as Sport Director. Benson then decided to give up the professional side of the game to set up a coaching business coaching the amateur side of the game. He took on the Crosfields first team job, Manchester Met University RL and Leigh Miners U13s, while still coaching Belgium. He coached each team for 2 years and in his second season he won every title available losing only 3 games in a season across all 4 teams.

Kiwi Ferns
He was appointed as the coach of the Kiwi Ferns in March 2017 where they competed at the 2017 Rugby League World Cup and lost narrowly in the Grand Final after completing the pool games undefeated.

References

1966 births
Living people
Belgium national rugby league team coaches
Hibiscus Coast Raiders coaches
Ireland national rugby league team coaches
Junior Kiwis coaches
Leigh Leopards coaches
London Skolars coaches
New Zealand expatriate sportspeople in England
New Zealand rugby league coaches
New Zealand women's national rugby league team coaches
Oldham R.L.F.C. coaches
Oxford Rugby League coaches